Harry is a television drama series that was made by Union Pictures for the BBC, and shown on BBC1 between 18 September 1993 and 12 April 1995.  The programme concerned a journalist called Harry Salter (played by Michael Elphick) who ran a news agency in the English town of Darlington in England.

Cast 
 Harry Salter – Michael Elphick
 Snappy – Ian Bartholomew
 Alice – Julie Graham
 Jonathan – Tom Hollander

Episodes

Series 1 (1993)

Series 2 (1995)

References

External links
 Episode guide at BFI Film and TV database
 

BBC television dramas
1990s British drama television series
1993 British television series debuts
1995 British television series endings
English-language television shows
Television shows set in County Durham
Television shows set in Northumberland